Trophonopsis bonneti is an extinct species of sea snail, a marine gastropod mollusk in the family Muricidae, the murex snails or rock snails.

Description

Distribution
Fossils were found in Eocene strata of Paris Basin, France.

References

 Le Renard, J. & Pacaud, J. (1995). Révision des mollusques Paléogènes du Bassin de Paris. II. Liste des références primaires des espèces. Cossmanniana. 3: 65-132.

External links
 Cossmann M. & Pissarro G. (1904-1913). Iconographie complète des coquilles fossiles de l'Eocène des environs de Paris. Tome 1, Pélécypodes: pls 1-16

bonneti
Gastropods described in 1913